Rosy Lubaki (born 10 February 1998) is a Congolese football player who plays for Hungarian club Újpest II.

Career

Újpest
On 10 November 2018, Lubaki played his first match for Újpest in a 4-1 win against Kisvárda in the Hungarian League.

Club statistics

Updated to games played as of 19 May 2019.

References

External links

1998 births
Living people
Democratic Republic of the Congo footballers
Association football forwards
Újpest FC players
Nemzeti Bajnokság I players
Democratic Republic of the Congo expatriate footballers
Expatriate footballers in Hungary
Democratic Republic of the Congo expatriate sportspeople in Hungary